Kusi Obodom was the ruler of the Ashanti Empire from 1750 to 1764. He ruled during the Oyoko Abohyen dynasty.  He was the grandnephew of Osei Tutu, who had been king of Ashanti in 1701. Kusi Obodom's mother, Nkaatia Ntim Abamo, was the second Asantehemaa.  Kusi Obodom held the title of Asantehene. 

Kusi Obodom became Asantehene after debate - and occasional violence - over the Golden Stool.

Obodom was succeeded by his nephew, Osei Kwadwo.

References 

18th-century rulers in Africa
Ashanti monarchs
Year of death unknown
Year of birth unknown